Yesmín M. Valdivieso Galib is the current Comptroller of Puerto Rico. Valdivieso was appointed by Luis Fortuño with advise and consent from the 24th Senate of Puerto Rico and the 28th House of Representatives.

References

Georgetown University alumni
Comptrollers in the United States
Living people
People from San Juan, Puerto Rico
Puerto Rican civil servants
1961 births
Puerto Rican women in politics
Women accountants